Andrew Logan (b. 11 Oct 1945) is an English sculptor, performance artist, jewellery-maker, and portraitist.

Biography
Andrew Logan was born at Witney, Oxfordshire, in England. He was educated as an architect at the Oxford School of Architecture, graduating in 1970. He founded the Alternative Miss World in 1972, which he continued to run as of 2018. He influenced film-maker Derek Jarman, whose early film-making work documented the social scene around Logan and his studios at Butler's Wharf, London. Malcolm McLaren and Vivienne Westwood staged the  "Valentine's Ball", at which the Sex Pistols first came to media attention, at his studios in 1976.

In 1991 a major retrospective of his work was held at the Museum of Modern Art, Oxford. The Andrew Logan Museum of Sculpture, at Berriew in the Welsh Marches, opened in 1991 and houses much of his sculpture and painting in converted squash courts.

Since the early Nineties, Logan has continued to exhibit his sculptures and jewellery at Saint Petersburg in Russia, Lithuania, India, Beverly Hills in Los Angeles and Mexico. His work has been shown in and commissioned by international galleries, including the American Visionary Art Museum in Baltimore, the Flower East Gallery in London, the Victoria & Albert Museum, the Hayward Gallery, Bonhams,  the National Portrait Gallery, Sotheby's in London, the Royal Academy of Arts, the National Trust’s Buckland Abbey and Somerset House.

In London, he has exhibited in venues including Trafalgar Square, the foyer of Sadler's Wells Theatre, and West End cinemas. His lifesize horse sculptures, Pegasus 1 and 11 were displayed at Heathrow Airport, and his 'Icarus' sculpture hangs in Guy's Hospital. The P & O Superliner Arcadia commissioned him to sculpt his Cosmic Eggs (8 ft. tall), and his Mermaid Chandelier was exhibited at the American Visionary Art Museum in Baltimore, USA.

In the new millennium, Logan created jewelled sculptures for The Magic Flute opera in San Diego. In 2004, Logan's eleventh Alternative Miss World contest was held at the Hippodrome in London. 
In May 2007 Logan was invited to be part of the jury for a children's beauty contest in Sochi. In July, his jewellery was auctioned at Halls Fine Art in Shrewsbury. He was asked to decorate a guitar for a high-profile charity auction held in London. In August, he was invited to participate in three events in The Big Draw: he collaborated with Zandra Rhodes on The Big Picture Frame at the V&A Museum of Childhood in Bethnal Green, he gave a presentation of his watercolours in The Newsroom at The Guardian and in Covent Garden.

In 2017 an exhibition of many pieces of sculpture by Logan titled The Art of Reflection was held at the National Trust's Buckland Abbey in Devon with works from 1976 to 2017.

References

External links
 andrewlogan.com - official site
 Alternative Miss World - official site
 Works in the collection of the National Portrait Gallery

1945 births
Living people
20th-century British sculptors
21st-century British sculptors
20th-century English male artists
21st-century English male artists
Gay sculptors
People from Witney
English LGBT sculptors
English gay artists
English performance artists
20th-century English LGBT people
21st-century English LGBT people